Zhang Zhiyuan (born 25 April 1994) is a Chinese rower.

He won a medal at the 2019 World Rowing Championships.

References

External links

1994 births
Living people
Chinese male rowers
World Rowing Championships medalists for China
Asian Games medalists in rowing
Rowers at the 2018 Asian Games
Asian Games silver medalists for China
Medalists at the 2018 Asian Games
20th-century Chinese people
21st-century Chinese people